Sambú Airport  is an airport serving the Sambú River towns of Sambú and Puerto Indio, Panama.

Airlines and destinations

See also

List of airports in Panama
Transport in Panama

References

External links
 OpenStreetMap - Sambú
 Great Circle Mapper - Sambú
 
 Landing northwest over Puerto Indio
 Aerial view looking north
 Sambu Hause B&B

Airports in Panama
Buildings and structures in Darién Province